Kalyan Banerjee was President of Rotary International, one of the largest humanitarian service organizations in the world, for the year 2011-2012. He took office on 1 July 2011. He took over from Ray Klinginsmith. He leads a worldwide network of 1.2 million individuals from more than 200 countries and geographical regions who, through volunteer service, help meet the needs of communities worldwide. He is Rotary International’s 101st President.

Early life and education 
Kalyan Banerjee belongs to the Rotary Club of Vapi, Gujarat, India. 
He earned a degree in chemical engineering from the Indian Institute of Technology Kharagpur in 1964.

Career 
He is Rotary International's third President from India. India is the third largest contributor to The Rotary Foundation.

He is a director of United Phosphorus Limited, the largest agrochemical manufacturer of India, and the chairman of United Phosphorus (Bangladesh) Limited. He is a member of the Indian Institute of Chemical Engineers and the American Chemical Society. He has been president of Vapi Industries Association and chairman of the Gujarat chapter of the Confederation of Indian Industry (CII).

Personal life
Banerjee is based in Vapi. He is married to Binota, and the couple have two children and four grandchildren.

References

External links
 United Phosphorus Limited website
 Facebook Profile

Rotary International leaders
1942 births
Living people
20th-century Bengalis
21st-century Bengalis
Scindia School alumni
Visva-Bharati University alumni
IIT Kharagpur alumni
Indian chemical engineers
Businesspeople from Gujarat
Businesspeople from Kolkata